Flaming Youth can refer to:
 Flaming Youth (novel), a 1923 novel by Samuel Hopkins Adams
 Flaming Youth (film), a 1923 film based on the novel starring Colleen Moore and Milton Sills
 Flaming Youth (band), a 1960s British rock group
 "Flaming Youth" (song), a song by the rock group Kiss